The Veneto Autonomous Region Movement (Movimento Veneto Regione Autonoma, MVRA) was a Venetist political party active in Veneto.

MVRA was launched in 1987 by Geppino and Umberto Vecchiato (splinters of Liga Veneta) and by Giulio Pizzati's Liga Federativa Veneta (LFV), founded in 1983. The party included also Flaminio De Poli, who had been one of the most outspoken independentist figures in Veneto so far and who had been particularly critical of the alliance between Liga Veneta and Lega Lombarda.

In the 1992 general election MVRA gained 1.5% of the regional vote.

By 2000 the party was merged into Liga Veneta Repubblica (LVR).

References

Sources
Francesco Jori, Dalla Łiga alla Lega. Storia, movimenti, protagonisti, Marsilio, Venice 2009
Ezio Toffano, Short History of the Venetian Autonomism, Raixe Venete

Political parties in Veneto
Venetian nationalism
Political parties established in 1987